is a passenger railway station  located in the town of Hōki, Tottori Prefecture, Japan. It is operated by the West Japan Railway Company (JR West).

Lines

Station layout
The station consists of one ground-level island platform connected with the station building by a level crossing. The station is unattended.

Platforms

Adjacent stations

History
Hōki-Mizoguchi Station opened on August 10, 1919. With the privatization of the Japan National Railways (JNR) on April 1, 1987, the station came under the aegis of the West Japan Railway Company.

Passenger statistics
In fiscal 2018, the station was used by an average of 156 passengers daily.

Surrounding area
 Hōki Town Office Mizonokuchi Branch Office
 Hōki Municipal Mizoguchi Junior High School

See also
List of railway stations in Japan

References

External links 

 Hōki-Mizoguchi Station from JR-Odekake.net 

Railway stations in Tottori Prefecture
Stations of West Japan Railway Company
Hakubi Line
Railway stations in Japan opened in 1919
Hōki, Tottori